was a Japanese politician and cabinet member.

Inagaki was elected to his first term in the Japanese House of Representatives in 1977. In 1984, he was part of the LDP Party and served on the Social Security System Consultative Council as an SLAC board member. From 1984 to 1985, Inagaki also joined the Diet's Public Pensions Research Subcommittee as a member. He joined the cabinet under former Japanese Prime Minister Ryutaro Hashimoto during the 1990s, where he served as the head of the Hokkaidō and Okinawa development agencies.

Inagaki largely retired from politics after he was defeated for re-election in 2000. He was arrested in 2004 and charged with violating an investment law concerning his company for which he was convicted.  He was sentenced to two years in prison, suspended for five years, beginning in 2005.

Jitsuo Inagaki died at his home in Tokyo of a natural illness at the age of 80.

References 

1928 births
2009 deaths
Politicians from Aichi Prefecture
Waseda University alumni
Members of the House of Representatives (Japan)
Government ministers of Japan
Japanese politicians convicted of crimes